Pradeep Kumar is an Indian politician and member of the 13th,
16th and 17th Legislative Assembly of Uttar Pradesh. In 2017 he represented the Gangoh constituency of Uttar Pradesh and is a member of the Bhartiya Janata Party. He is elected as Member of Parliament in 17th Lok sabha from Kairana seat. Pradeep Choudhary's father Late Master Kanwarpal Singh remained for 3 terms MLA. Pradeep Choudhary is also titled with (Vikas Purush).

Personal life
Kumar was born on 10 March 1969 to Kanwarpal Singh in a  Gurjar family of Dudhla village of Gangoh block in Uttar Pradesh. He holds a post-graduate degree. Kumar married Sunita Chaudhary on 19 February 1999, with whom he has two sons. He is an agriculturist by profession.

Political career
Kumar has been an MLA three times. During his first time, he was elected in the by-elections in 2000 at Nakur (Assembly constituency) as a member of Rashtriya Lok Dal. He was then elected to the Sixteenth Legislative Assembly of Uttar Pradesh in 2012 at Gangoh (Assembly constituency) as a member of Indian National Congress, defeating Samajwadi Party candidate Ruder Sen by a margin of 4,023 votes.

He was elected to the Seventeenth Legislative Assembly of Uttar Pradesh in 2017 again at Gangoh (Assembly constituency) as a member of Bhartiya Janata Party, defeating Indian National Congress candidate Nauman Masood by a margin of 38,028 votes.

Posts held

See also

 Gangoh
 Uttar Pradesh Legislative Assembly
 16th Legislative Assembly of Uttar Pradesh
 14th Legislative Assembly of Uttar Pradesh
 Politics of India
 Indian National Congress

References

People from Saharanpur district
1969 births
Indian National Congress politicians
Samajwadi Party politicians
Rashtriya Lok Dal politicians
Bharatiya Janata Party politicians from Uttar Pradesh
Living people
Uttar Pradesh MLAs 2017–2022
Uttar Pradesh MLAs 2012–2017
Uttar Pradesh MLAs 1997–2002
India MPs 2019–present
Janata Party politicians